The Crown of Zvonimir was bestowed on King Dmitar Zvonimir of Croatia in 1076 by the papal legate. Zvonimir ruled Croatia until 1089 after which the crown was used in the coronation of his successor Stjepan II and presumably by the numerous Hungarian monarchs after the unification of the Kingdom of Croatia and Kingdom of Hungary in 1102.

It is quite possible that the crown was lost during the 1520s when the Ottoman Turks captured and sacked the royal capitals of Solin and Knin. It is not known whether the medieval Crown of Zvonimir still exists.

A stylised version of this crown is used on several provincial and county flags in modern Croatia and is consistently of the design illustrated here which is taken from an 11th-century engraving found in a baptistry in Split.  The distinctive long sides could be hanging pendilia as found adorning the Holy Crown of Hungary which was also an 11th-century papal gift.

World War II appropriation
In 1941, the fascist Ustaše regime assumed control of Croatia and decided to reinstate a monarchy in the Independent State of Croatia, also appropriating the symbols of the medieval Croatian state. They created another "Crown of Zvonimir", though with little resemblance to the original, described as "a wreath of golden clover leaves surmounted by a cross". That crown, as well as an orb in the form of an apple, was then presented to Victor Emmanuel III of Italy with the request he choose a suitable member of the House of Savoy to be elevated to the proposed Croatian throne as king. He chose the Duke of Spoleto who was then named "King Tomislav II". It seems likely he came into possession of the regalia, though he was never crowned. It is unknown whether this crown remains in existence.

See also
Medal of the Crown of King Zvonimir

External links
Croatian crown in the 17th century (in Croatian)

References

Zvonomir
Medieval Kingdom of Croatia
Medieval crowns